Vinah (also Romanized as Vīnah; also known as Bahārān and Vīneh-ye Bahārān) is a village in Osmanvand Rural District, Firuzabad District, Kermanshah County, Kermanshah Province, Iran. At the 2006 census, its population was 206, in 44 families.

References 

Populated places in Kermanshah County